Notable events of 2003 in webcomics.

Events

Mike Krahulik and Jerry Holkins of Penny Arcade founded Child's Play.

Awards
Web Cartoonist's Choice Awards, "Outstanding Comic" won by Justine Shaw's Nowhere Girl.
Ignatz Awards, "Outstanding Online Comic" won by James Kochalka's American Elf.
Justine Shaw's Nowhere Girl becomes the first webcomic to be nominated for an Eisner Award.

Webcomics started

 January 1 — A Modest Destiny by Sean Howard
 February 1 — Dinosaur Comics by Ryan North
 February 7 — A Softer World by Joey Comeau and Emily Horne
 February 10 — Least I Could Do by Ryan Sohmer and Lar DeSouza
 February — Idiot Box by Matt Bors
 March — Digger by Ursula Vernon
 April 6 — Girly by Jackie Lesnick
 April 20 — No Rest for the Wicked by Andrea L. Peterson
 May — Wondermark by David Malki
 June 11 — Count Your Sheep by Adrian 'Adis' Ramos
 June 30 — Badmash by Sandeep Sood, Nimesh Patel, and Sanjay Shah
 June 30 — The Right Number by Scott McCloud
 July 13 — Zap! by Chris Layfield and Pascalle Lepas
 August 2 — Questionable Content by Jeph Jacques
 August 4 — Loxie & Zoot by Stephen Crowley
 September 25 —The Order of the Stick by Rich Burlew
 September — Smithson by Shaenon K. Garrity et al.
 October 22 — Twisted Kaiju Theater by Shin Goji
 October 22 — Twokinds by Tom Fischbach
 November 1 — y2cl by John Horsley
 Anima: Age of the Robots by Johnny Tay
 El Listo by Xavier Àgueda
 Hetalia: Axis Powers by Hidekaz Himaruya
 Inverloch by Sarah Ellerton
 Is This Tomorrow? by Kelly Shane and Woody Compton
 Li'l Mell and Sergio by Shaenon K. Garrity et al.
 Unspeakable Vault (Of Doom) by François Launet

Webcomics ended
 Leisure Town by Tristan A. Farnon, 1997 – 2003
 Makeshift Miracle by Jim Zubkavich, September 10, 2001 – March 4, 2003
 Zombie and Mummy by Olia Lialina and Dragan Espenschied, 2001 – 2003

References

 
Webcomics by year